Nattress is a Saxon surname that predates the Norman invasion and may refer to:

 Clive Nattress (born 1951), English footballer
 Ralph Nattrass (1925–2014), Canadian hockey player
 Ric Nattress (born 1962), Canadian hockey player
 K. Brett Nattress, a leader of The Church of Jesus Christ of Latter-day Saints